Kitisuru is a residential suburb of Nairobi. The name Kitisuru comes from a nearby river "Gĩtathuru" which was borrowed from the original inhabitants of the area who were mainly of the [Kikuyu]] ethnic group. Kitisuru forms part of Kitisuru Ward, an electoral division within Nairobi City County.

Location
The coordinates of Kitisuru are:01 12 24S, 36 46 08E (Latitude:-1.2400; Longitude:36.7688).

Overview
Kitisuru is an affluent residential suburb of Nairobi. There are several residential neighbourhoods with schools and places of worship. These include New Kitisuru, which borders Mwimuto in Kiambu County.

Schools
Educational institutions located in this area include International School of Kenya  (which caters mostly to US Embassy staff) and School of the Nations (Kenya), a Christian-based international school established by South Korean missionaries..

Population
The exact population of Kitisuru is not publicly known as of November 2010. Loresho, Kyuna and Lower Kabete Sub–locations form part of the greater Kitisuru Ward. Some roads that pass via Kitisuru area include Lower Kabete Road, Getathuru Road, Kitisuru Road, Kirawa Road, Ngecha Road and part of Peponi Road.

See also
 Parklands, Nairobi
 Westlands
 Upper Hill, Nairobi
 Nairobi

References

External links
 
 

Populated places in Kenya
Suburbs of Nairobi
Nairobi